The 2011 Nigerian Senate election in Taraba State was held on April 9, 2011, to elect members of the Nigerian Senate to represent Taraba State. Emmanuel Bwacha representing Taraba South, Abubakar Umar Tutare representing Taraba Central and Aisha Alhassan representing Taraba North all won on the platform of Peoples Democratic Party.

Overview

Summary

Results

Taraba South 
Peoples Democratic Party candidate Emmanuel Bwacha won the election, defeating other party candidates.

Taraba Central 
Peoples Democratic Party candidate Abubakar Umar Tutare won the election, defeating other party candidates.

Taraba North 
Peoples Democratic Party candidate Aisha Alhassan won the election, defeating party candidates.

References 

Taraba State Senate elections
Taraba State senatorial elections
Taraba State senatorial elections